Dhill is a 2001 Indian Tamil-language action film directed by Dharani. The film stars Vikram and Laila, while Ashish Vidyarthi, Nassar and Vivek play supporting roles. The film's score and soundtrack are composed by Vidyasagar, while S. Gopinath handled the camera work.

The film was released on 20 July 2001, and achieved critical and commercial success at the box office. The film was remade in Telugu as Sreeram (2002), Hindi as Dum (2003), Kannada as Sye (2005), Bengali Kolkata as Shatrur Makabila (2001) and in  Bengali Bangladesh as Arman (2002). Dhill was the first film to credit Vikram with the title Chiyaan.

Plot
Dhill is the story about Kanagavel (Vikram), whose only dream is to become a police officer. He succeeds in passing the exams and wins a girlfriend named Asha (Laila). One night after having dinner at a restaurant near the beach, Kanagavel goes to pay the bill, leaving Asha behind. At that moment a corrupt police officer named Inspector 'Encounter' Shankar (Ashish Vidyarthi) drinks and behaves indecently to Asha. He then attempts to assault her but is severely beaten up by Kanagavel, and he receives a scar on his face. Shankar, angered by this, seeks revenge against Kanagavel. In the end, Kanagavel kills Shankar and his goons.

Cast

 Vikram as Kanagavel
 Laila as Asha
 Ashish Vidyarthi as Inspector Shankar, later DSP / aka Encounter Shankar
 Nassar as Chief of Police Training Academy
 FEFSI Vijayan as Aadhi Bhagavan aka Adi
 Vivek as Megaserial Mahadevan
 Rajasekhar as Subramaniam, Kanagavel's father
 Kalairani as Kanagavel's mother
 Deepa Venkat as Selvi,Kanagavel's sister
 Akash as Sekar,Kanagavel's brother-in-law, and Asha's brother 
 Vijaya Bharathi as Commissioner's wife
 Sukran as Ashok
 Mayilsamy as Kanagavel's friend
 Vaiyapuri as Udumalai
 Mohan Raj as Minister Vedhanayagam
 Charuhasan as Minister
 MRK
 R. N. R. Manohar
 Crane Manohar
 Karnaa Radha
 Manikka Vinayagam
 Alphonsa in an item number (Machan Meesai)

Production
Vikram, after the success of the critically acclaimed Sethu, chose to sign on to appear in an action film directed by his Loyola College classmate Dharani. The director had previously worked under the name of Ramani and had made the Mammootty starrer Ethirum Pudhirum in 1999. The film was initially titled as Kanagavel after the lead character, before being renamed to Dhill. To appear trim in the role of the aspiring police officer, Vikram went on a strict diet eating only fruits and drinking juice. He revealed that for the film when bulking, he was on 25 egg whites and one whole cooked chicken a day and also employed a body builder to train him.

Vikram often helped out during the shooting of the film by helping suggest changes to scenes. The film also marked the Tamil debut of Hindi actor Ashish Vidyarthi, who has since gone on to appear in several other prominent films. The actor had to wear prosthetic make-up for the film, noting that it took over one hour to put on.

Soundtrack
The Music Was Composed By Vidyasagar.

Release
The Hindu stated that "Vikram has the ability and potential" and that "Vikram has once again proved that his success in Sethu was not a fluke". Ayappa Prasad from Screen Magazine wrote that " Dhill stands out for its convincing storyline and a good performance by Vikram who has strained a lot to be a good action hero who can also emote". Dhill became Vikram's first success in the masala film genre and led the way for more such films in the same genre for him.

Dhill won six Tamil Nadu State Film Awards for 2001 with Vidyasagar winning the Best Music Director award for his work in Dhill alongside Thavasi and Poovellam Un Vasam. The film also won the Best Male Playback Singer for P. Unnikrishnan, Best Female Playback Singer for Sujatha and the Best Make-up Artist award for Nageswar Rao. Furthermore, dubbing artistes Sai Ravi and Sreeja picked up the Best Male Dubbing Artist and Best Female Dubbing Artist respectively for their work in the film.

The success of Dhill prompted Vikram and Dharani to come together in 2002 for a project titled Dhool, which also went on to do become a large commercial success. Furthermore, to capitulate on the hit pair of Vikram and Laila, a 1997 Malayalam film they had starred in together, Ithu Oru Snehagadha was dubbed and released in Tamil as Thrill.

Dubbed versions and remakes 

Despite the remakes, the film was dubbed and released in Hindi twice under the titles Meri Aan: Man In Work (2009 (1st dub) and 2021 (2nd dub)) respectively.

References

External links 
 

2001 films
2000s masala films
Tamil films remade in other languages
2000s Tamil-language films
Films scored by Vidyasagar
Fictional portrayals of the Tamil Nadu Police
Indian action films
Films directed by Dharani
2001 action films